Carlos Barreto may refer to:
 Carlos Barreto (boxer)
 Carlos Barreto (fighter)